Con Sullivan (1886–1964) was a New Zealand international rugby league footballer who played in the 1900s and 1910s for various Australasian representative sides.

Playing career
Sullivan started his career playing rugby in Wellington where he was a representative player. In 1909 he switched codes and was selected to tour Australia, winning an international cap for New Zealand against Australia in 1909. He played 5 other tour matches, scoring 2 tries. In 1910 he started playing for North Sydney in the NSWRFL Premiership. Later in the year he played 2 matches for the Wellington rugby league team against Taranaki and Auckland.

In his first year at the club he was selected to play for New South Wales, Australia (including the first Ashes test on Australian soil) and a combined "Australasia" team against the first Great Britain Lions tourists. The following year he was selected to go on the 1911–12 Kangaroo tour of Great Britain, and played in 16 matches, for Australasia, including the third Test. Sullivan toured New Zealand with the New South Wales side in 1912-13 and played his last Test series against England in 1914 in teams captained by his clubmate and brother-in-law Sid Deane.

Later years
Sullivan later married Deane's sister with their son Bob Sullivan continuing the family link with the club. Bob Sullivan made a Test appearance for Australia in 1954. His younger brother John also played for Norths in the 1950s as a versatile back.

Con Sullivan died in October 1964.

References

Australian rugby league players
North Sydney Bears players
Australia national rugby league team players
Australasia rugby league team players
New Zealand national rugby league team players
New South Wales rugby league team players
1964 deaths
Wellington rugby league team players
1886 births
Rugby league props
Rugby league second-rows
Rugby league hookers
Date of birth missing
Rugby league players from Sydney